Luxembourg competed at the 2022 Winter Olympics in Beijing, China, from 4 to 20 February 2022.

The Luxembourg team consisted of two athletes (one per gender) competing in alpine skiing. Matthieu Osch and Gwyneth ten Raa were the country's flagbearer during the opening ceremony. Meanwhile Osch was also the flagbearer during the closing ceremony.

Competitors
The following is the list of number of competitors participating at the Games per sport/discipline.

Alpine skiing

By meeting the basic qualification standards Luxembourg qualified one male and one female alpine skier.

Non-competing sport

Cross-country skiing

By meeting the basic qualification standards, Luxembourg qualified one male cross-country skier, but chose not to use the quota.

References

Nations at the 2022 Winter Olympics
2022
Winter Olympics